La Ley, Spanish for The Law, may refer to:

La Ley (band), a Chilean rock band
La Ley (EP), a 1988 EP by the band
La Ley (album), a 1993 album by the band
"La Ley", a 2019 song by CNCO
La Ley (publisher), an Argentine publishing company
La Ley 96.9, or WWPL, a Spanish-language radio station in Goldsboro, North Carolina, US
WLEY-FM, branded La Ley, a Spanish-language radio station in Aurora, Illinois, US

See also
Ley (disambiguation)
LEY (disambiguation)